Talent Team Papendal (TTPA) is a Dutch volleyball club based in Arnhem. It has men's and women's teams, both playing in the Eredivisie (highest league in the Netherlands).

History
Using the facilities of the Dutch Olympic Committee*Dutch Sports Federation (NOC*NSF) at the National Sports Centre Papendal, the Telent Team Papendal Arnhem was created as men's and women's volleyball teams, both composed of players aged between 14 and 18 years old, who train, study and live in the National Centre. Competing in the country's highest professional league allows the players the opportunity to develop their talents.

References

External links
 Official website 

Dutch volleyball clubs
Sport in Arnhem